Westtown Township is a township in Chester County, Pennsylvania, United States. The population was 10,827 at the 2010 census.

History 
County Bridge No. 148 was listed on the National Register of Historic Places in 1988.

Geography

Demographics

At the 2010 census, the township was 89.4% non-Hispanic White, 3.8% Black or African American, 0.1% Native American, 3.2% Asian, 0.1% Native Hawaiian or other Pacific Islander, and 1.3% were two or more races. 2.4% of the population were of Hispanic or Latino ancestry .

As of the census of 2000, there were 10,352 people, 3,705 households, and 2,949 families residing in the township.  The population density was 1,185.5 people per square mile (457.8/km).  There were 3,795 housing units at an average density of 434.6/sq mi (167.8/km).  The racial makeup of the township was 93.97% White, 2.59% African American, 0.07% Native American, 2.42% Asian, 0.01% Pacific Islander, 0.37% from other races, and 0.57% from two or more races. Hispanic or Latino of any race were 1.13% of the population.

There were 3,705 households, out of which 38.7% had children under the age of 18 living with them, 70.6% were married couples living together, 6.9% had a female householder with no husband present, and 20.4% were non-families. 16.0% of all households were made up of individuals, and 4.0% had someone living alone who was 65 years of age or older.  The average household size was 2.78 and the average family size was 3.14.

In the township the population was spread out, with 26.9% under the age of 18, 6.0% from 18 to 24, 28.9% from 25 to 44, 28.2% from 45 to 64, and 9.9% who were 65 years of age or older.  The median age was 39 years. For every 100 females, there were 96.0 males.  For every 100 females age 18 and over, there were 93.1 males.

The median income for a household in the township was $85,049, and the median income for a family was $96,318. Males had a median income of $66,675 versus $43,482 for females. The per capita income for the township was $36,894.  About 2.1% of families and 3.0% of the population were below the poverty line, including 1.7% of those under age 18 and 3.5% of those age 65 or over.

Political representation
Westtown Township is represented by State Representative, Carolyn Comitta – 156th District and State Senator, Tom Killion – 9th District. In the U.S. House of Representatives, Representative Chrissy Houlahan, 6th District (as of 2019) and U.S. Senators Pat Toomey and Bob Casey Jr. (as of 2019).

Township officials
Westtown Township is governed by a three (3) member Board of Supervisors.  Under the supervision of the Board the township has many arms of government, including the Township's Planning Commission, Historical Commission, Parks & Recreation Commission, and the Zoning Hearing Board.

Township Board of Supervisors members 2020:
Richard Pomerantz, Chair
Carol R. DeWolf, Vice Chair
Scott Yaw, Police Commissioner
VACANT - Township Manager

Transportation

Numbered roads serving Westtown Township include U.S. Route 202/U.S. Route 322, Pennsylvania Route 3, Pennsylvania Route 352 and Pennsylvania Route 926. US 202/US 322 follow Wilmington Pike along a northwest-southeast alignment across the southwestern portion of the township. PA 3 follows West Chester Pike along an east-west alignment across the northern corner of the township. PA 352 follows Chester Road along a northwest-southeast alignment across the northeastern portion of the township. Finally, PA 926 follows Street Road along a northeast-southwest alignment along the southeastern edge of the township.

Education

West Chester Area School District serves the township. Elementary schools serving sections include Penn Wood, Sarah Starkweather, Westtown-Thornbury, and Glen Acres. Almost all residents are zoned to Stetson Middle School and West Chester Rustin High School, while the far northern portion of the township is zoned to Fugett Middle School and West Chester East High School.

Other schools in the township include Westtown School, an independent school for grades pre-K through 12; the St. Maximilian Kolbe Parish School, and the Ss. Simon and Jude Parish School, Catholic schools for grades pre-K through 8; and the Concept School, a private school for grades 5 through 12.

References

External links

Westtown Township official website
 Chester County Connect's Westtown Township Information Page
Westtown-East Goshen Regional Police Department

Townships in Chester County, Pennsylvania
Townships in Pennsylvania